Terrence Nigel Dixie (born October 15, 1983) is a Seychellois weightlifter. Dixie represented Seychelles at the 2008 Summer Olympics in Beijing, where he competed for the men's light heavyweight class (85 kg). Dixie placed sixteenth in this event, as he successfully lifted 115 kg in the single-motion snatch, and hoisted 140 kg in the two-part, shoulder-to-overhead clean and jerk, for a total of 255 kg.

References

External links
NBC 2008 Olympics profile

Seychellois male weightlifters
1983 births
Living people
Olympic weightlifters of Seychelles
Weightlifters at the 2008 Summer Olympics